William Robert Cairns (born 8 April 1961) was a Scottish footballer who played for Queen's Park, Partick Thistle and Dumbarton in the 1980s.

References

1961 births
Scottish footballers
Association football defenders
Dumbarton F.C. players
Queen's Park F.C. players
Partick Thistle F.C. players
Scottish Football League players
Footballers from Glasgow
Living people